The Departmental T20 Women's Championship was a women's domestic Twenty20 competition that took place in Pakistan in 2018 and 2018–19. Four teams, three departmental and one XI formed by the Pakistan Cricket Board, competed in the double round-robin group stage.

Zarai Taraqiati Bank Limited won both editions of the tournament. The tournament was succeeded by the PCB Triangular Twenty20 Women's Tournament.

History
The Departmental T20 Women's Championship was established in 2018, replacing the Women's Cricket Challenge Trophy. Four teams, Higher Education Commission, State Bank of Pakistan, Zarai Taraqiati Bank Limited and a PCB XI, competed in a Twenty20 double round-robin group held at the National Stadium, Karachi in May 2018. Zarai Taraqiati Bank Limited and PCB XI progressed to the final, which was one by Zarai Taraqiati Bank Limited by 46 runs, helped by half-centuries from Nain Abidi and Bismah Maroof.

The following tournament took place in the 2018–19 season at Diamond Club Ground, Islamabad in March and April 2019. Zarai Taraqiati Bank Limited and State Bank of Pakistan qualified for the final, which was again won by Zarai Taraqiati Bank Limited, with Javeria Khan making a half-century for the victors. The following season, the tournament was replaced by the PCB Triangular Twenty20 Women's Tournament.

Teams

Results

See also
 Women's Cricket Challenge Trophy
 PCB Triangular Twenty20 Women's Tournament

References

Pakistani domestic cricket competitions
Women's cricket competitions in Pakistan
Recurring sporting events established in 2018
2018 establishments in Pakistan
Twenty20 cricket leagues